The PARKROYAL COLLECTION Marina Bay, Singapore (formerly Marina Mandarin Singapore) is a five-star luxury hotel located on Raffles Boulevard in the Marina Centre complex, in the Downtown Core of Singapore.

Hotel
Designed by John Portman, the hotel has one of the largest open atriums in Southeast Asia, which rises through 21 levels and is permeated by natural light. Each of the 575 rooms is accessed from the balconies overlooking the atrium, and has views of the Singapore harbour and the city skyline.

References

External links

Official hotel website

Skyscraper hotels in Singapore
Marina Centre
Downtown Core (Singapore)
Twisted buildings and structures
John C. Portman Jr. buildings
Hotels established in 1987
1987 establishments in Singapore